Tierra may refer to:

Astronomy
Earth in the Spanish and Asturian language

Computing and games
 Tierra (computer simulation), a computer simulation of life by the ecologist Thomas S. Ray
 Tierra Entertainment, now known as AGD Interactive, a non-profit game company specializing in remakes of classic adventure games by Sierra Entertainment

Film
 Tierra (film), a 1996 movie by the Spanish filmmaker Julio Medem

Music
 Tierra (band), a Latin R&B band from the 1970s and 1980s

Albums 
 Tierra (Tierra album), a 1973 album by Tierra
 Tierra (L'Arc-en-Ciel album), a 1994 album by the Japanese rock band L'Arc-en-Ciel

See also
 Tiara, a type of crown or headpiece